The 1997 Rugby World Cup Sevens was the second edition of the Rugby World Cup Sevens tournament and the first to be held in Hong Kong. It was the last major sporting event to be held in the then British dependency before the transfer of sovereignty to China which took place just three months later. Fiji defeated South Africa 24–21 to take the title for the first time. The final is considered to be one of the best sevens matches of all time.

Participating nations

The twenty four teams were divided into eight pools of three as follows:

Squads

Day 1 results

Pool A

Pool B

Pool C

Pool D

Pool E

Pool F

Pool G

Pool H

Seedings after Day 1
{| class="wikitable" style="text-align: center;"
|-
!width="200"|Team
!width="40"|Pld
!width="40"|W
!width="40"|D
!width="40"|L
!width="40"|PF
!width="40"|PA
!width="40"|+/-
!width="40"|Seed
!width="40"|Day 2 Pool
|-
|align=left| 
|2||2||0||0||104||0||104||1||A2
|-
|align=left| 
|2||2||0||0||83||12||71||2||B2
|-
|align=left| 
|2||2||0||0||74||29||45||3||C2
|-
|align=left| 
|2||2||0||0||73||10||63||4||D2
|-
|align=left| 
|2||2||0||0||68||21||47||5||E2
|-
|align=left| 
|2||2||0||0||59||19||40||6||F2
|-
|align=left| 
|2||2||0||0||57||17||40||7||G2
|-
|align=left| 
|2||1||1||0||57||26||31||8||H2
|-
|align=left| 
|2||1||1||0||45||33||12||9||H2
|-
|align=left| 
|2||1||0||1||49||33||16||10||G2
|-
|align=left| 
|2||1||0||1||43||48||-5||11||F2
|-
|align=left| 
|2||1||0||1||42||28||14||12||E2
|-
|align=left| 
|2||1||0||1||38||42||-4||13||D2
|-
|align=left| 
|2||1||0||1||38||67||-29||14||C2
|-
|align=left| 
|2||1||0||1||33||57||-24||15||B2
|-
|align=left| 
|2||0||1||1||36||38||-2||16||A2
|-
|align=left| 
|2||0||1||1||17||60||-43||17||A2
|-
|align=left| 
|2||0||0||2||27||69||-42||18||B2
|-
|align=left| 
|2||0||0||2||22||57||-35||19||C2
|-
|align=left| 
|2||0||0||2||21||64||-43||20||D2
|-
|align=left| 
|2||0||0||2||21||82||-61||21||E2
|-
|align=left| 
|2||0||0||2||19||75||-56||22||F2
|-
|align=left| 
|2||0||0||2||12||71||-59||23||G2
|-
|align=left| 
|2||0||0||2||12||92||-80||24||H2
|}

Day 2 results

All times Hong Kong time (UTC+1)

Pool A 
{| class="wikitable" style="text-align: center;"
|-
!width="200"|Team
!width="40"|Pld
!width="40"|W
!width="40"|D
!width="40"|L
!width="40"|PF
!width="40"|PA
!width="40"|+/-
!width="40"|Pts
|- bgcolor="#ccffcc"
|align=left| 
|2||2||0||0||101||0||101||6
|- bgcolor="#ccccff"
|align=left| 
|2||1||0||1||40||40||0||4
|- bgcolor="#ffcccc"
|align=left| 
|2||0||0||2||5||106||-101||2
|}

Pool B 
{| class="wikitable" style="text-align: center;"
|-
!width="200"|Team
!width="40"|Pld
!width="40"|W
!width="40"|D
!width="40"|L
!width="40"|PF
!width="40"|PA
!width="40"|+/-
!width="40"|Pts
|- bgcolor="#ccffcc"
|align=left| 
|2||2||0||0||63||12||51||6
|- bgcolor="#ccccff"
|align=left| 
|2||1||0||1||31||34||-3||4
|- bgcolor="#ffcccc"
|align=left| 
|2||0||0||2||12||60||-48||2
|}

Pool C 
{| class="wikitable" style="text-align: center;"
|-
!width="200"|Team
!width="40"|Pld
!width="40"|W
!width="40"|D
!width="40"|L
!width="40"|PF
!width="40"|PA
!width="40"|+/-
!width="40"|Pts
|- bgcolor="#ccffcc"
|align=left| 
|2||2||0||0||70||12||58||6
|- bgcolor="#ccccff"
|align=left| 
|2||1||0||1||45||35||10||4
|- bgcolor="#ffcccc"
|align=left| 
|2||0||0||2||7||75||-68||2
|}

Pool D 
{| class="wikitable" style="text-align: center;"
|-
!width="200"|Team
!width="40"|Pld
!width="40"|W
!width="40"|D
!width="40"|L
!width="40"|PF
!width="40"|PA
!width="40"|+/-
!width="40"|Pts
|- bgcolor="#ccffcc"
|align=left| 
|2||2||0||0||73||7||66||6
|- bgcolor="#ccccff"
|align=left| 
|2||1||0||1||17||45||-28||4
|- bgcolor="#ffcccc"
|align=left| 
|2||0||0||2||19||57||-38||2
|}

Pool E 
{| class="wikitable" style="text-align: center;"
|-
!width="200"|Team
!width="40"|Pld
!width="40"|W
!width="40"|D
!width="40"|L
!width="40"|PF
!width="40"|PA
!width="40"|+/-
!width="40"|Pts
|- bgcolor="#ccffcc"
|align=left| 
|2||2||0||0||78||5||73||6
|- bgcolor="#ccccff"
|align=left| 
|2||1||0||1||40||57||-17||4
|- bgcolor="#ffcccc"
|align=left| 
|2||0||0||2||26||82||-56||2
|}

Pool F 
{| class="wikitable" style="text-align: center;"
|-
!width="200"|Team
!width="40"|Pld
!width="40"|W
!width="40"|D
!width="40"|L
!width="40"|PF
!width="40"|PA
!width="40"|+/-
!width="40"|Pts
|- bgcolor="#ccffcc"
|align=left| 
|2||2||0||0||59||17||42||6
|- bgcolor="#ccccff"
|align=left| 
|2||1||0||1||15||29||-14||4
|- bgcolor="#ffcccc"
|align=left| 
|2||0||0||2||7||35||-28||2
|}

Pool G 
{| class="wikitable" style="text-align: center;"
|-
!width="200"|Team
!width="40"|Pld
!width="40"|W
!width="40"|D
!width="40"|L
!width="40"|PF
!width="40"|PA
!width="40"|+/-
!width="40"|Pts
|- bgcolor="#ccffcc"
|align=left| 
|2||1||1||0||33||22||11||5
|- bgcolor="#ccccff"
|align=left| 
|2||1||1||0||31||24||7||5
|- bgcolor="#ffcccc"
|align=left| 
|2||0||0||2||22||40||-18||2
|}

Pool H 
{| class="wikitable" style="text-align: center;"
|-
!width="200"|Team
!width="40"|Pld
!width="40"|W
!width="40"|D
!width="40"|L
!width="40"|PF
!width="40"|PA
!width="40"|+/-
!width="40"|Pts
|- bgcolor="#ccffcc"
|align=left| 
|2||2||0||0||57||26||31||6
|- bgcolor="#ccccff"
|align=left| 
|2||1||0||1||47||38||9||4
|- bgcolor="#ffcccc"
|align=left| 
|2||0||0||2||14||54||-40||2
|}

Day 3 - Knockout results

Bowl

Quarter-finals

Semi-finals

Final

Plate

Quarter-finals

Semi-finals

Final

Cup

Quarter-finals

Semi-finals

Final

See also
Rugby World Cup Sevens
Rugby World Cup

References

External links

RWC Sevens 1997
Rugby Union: Wales are denied by last-gasp try - The Independent

1997
International rugby union competitions hosted by Hong Kong
1997 rugby sevens competitions
1997 in Hong Kong sport
March 1997 sports events in Asia